Samuel Earl Samuels  (February 20, 1874 – February 22, 1964) was a third baseman for the St. Louis Browns of the National League in 1895. He was born in Quincy, Illinois, and was Jewish.

References

External links
 

1874 births
1964 deaths
19th-century baseball players
St. Louis Browns (NL) players
Baseball players from Illinois
Major League Baseball third basemen
Petersburg Farmers players
Hampton Clamdiggers players
Roanoke Magicians players
Quincy Bluebirds players
Burlington Colts players
Jewish American baseball players
Jewish Major League Baseball players
Sportspeople from Quincy, Illinois